Fərəcullalı is a village and municipality in the Jalilabad Rayon of Azerbaijan. It has a population of 155.

References

Populated places in Jalilabad District (Azerbaijan)